Ahmad Khormali is an Iranian football goalkeeper. He wears pyjama-like tracksuit bottoms while playing after Hungarian goalkeeper Gábor Király. He holds a B.Sc. in Social Sciences from Ferdowsi University of Mashhad.

Club career
He was linked to Persepolis in 2005, but was not signed. Khormali Played for Peresepolis Khorasan in Turkmenistan Presidential Cup 2006. He joined Iran Pro League's Saba Qom on June 14, 2011.

References 

 Khormali Stats
 Khormali: This is suspicious!
 Aboumoslem is about to be suspended
 The Empty Chest of The Blacks

External links 
Persian League Profile

Iranian footballers
Association football goalkeepers
F.C. Aboomoslem players
Saba players
Aluminium Hormozgan F.C. players
Living people
Year of birth missing (living people)